Rasmus Lindgren (born 17 June 1994) is a Swedish footballer who plays as a midfielder.

References

External links

 (archive)
 (archive)

1994 births
Living people
Association football midfielders
Helsingborgs IF players
IK Brage players
Allsvenskan players
Swedish footballers